"Sunday Sermons" is a song by American contemporary Christian music singer Anne Wilson. It was released on January 14, 2022, as the second single from her debut studio album, My Jesus (2022). Wilson co-wrote the song with Ben Glover and Jeff Sojka.

"Sunday Sermons" peaked at number five on the US Hot Christian Songs chart.

Background
On January 10, 2022, Anne Wilson announced that will be releasing a new single titled "Sunday Sermons" on January 14, availing the song for digital pre-order and also offering fans a snippet of the song to be sent via text message. "Sunday Sermons" was released on January 14, 2022, accompanied with a lyric video of the song. "Sunday Sermons" follows the release of her debut single "My Jesus" and the holiday-themed single "I Still Believe in Christmas" in 2021. 

Anne Wilson shared the story behind the song, saying:

Composition

Reception

Critical response
Jonathan Andre of 365 Days of Inspiring Media gave a positive review of "Sunday Sermons", saying: "the song is a reminder that we must not place tremendous importance on the big moment in someone's life, that just because someone has a 'w0ow' moment and they come to Christ in a profound way, doesn't mean that someone else's experience of growing up in a Christian home and becoming a Christian that way, is anything less than valid."

Accolades

Chart performance
"Sunday Sermons" debuted at number 38 on the US Hot Christian Songs chart dated January 29, 2022, concurrently charting at number three on the Christian Digital Song Sales chart.

"Sunday Sermons" made its debut at number 24 on the US Christian Airplay chart dated February 5, 2022, being the highest ranking debut that week.

Music videos
On January 14, 2022, Anne Wilson released the official lyric video for the song. On March 4, 2022, Anne Wilson released the official music video for "Sunday Sermons". On June 16, 2022, Anne Wilson released the official acoustic performance video for "Sunday Sermons".

Personnel
Adapted from AllMusic.
 Dallan Beck — editing
 Ben Glover — acoustic guitar, background vocals, electric guitar, engineer, keyboards, producer, programmer
 Lindsay Glover — background vocals
 Mark Hill — bass
 Willie “the Fish” Johnson — background vocals
 Joe LaPorta — mastering engineer
 Jerry McPherson — electric guitar
 Sean Moffitt — mixing
 Gordon Mote — Hammond B3, piano
 Randy Poole — engineer
 Jeff Sojka — background vocals, drums, engineer, keyboards, producer, programmer
 Demaryius Thomas — African Percussion
 Anne Wilson — primary artist, background vocals

Charts

Weekly charts

Year-end charts

Release history

References

External links
 

2022 singles
2022 songs
Anne Wilson songs
Songs written by Anne Wilson
Songs written by Ben Glover
Sparrow Records singles